Amadou-Mahtar M'Bow, GCIH (born 20 March 1921) is a Senegalese retired civil servant and former Director-General of UNESCO. Born in Dakar, M'bow served in France and North Africa during World War II after volunteering for the French Army, also serving with the Free French, and finally in the French Air Force. After the end of the war, he studied geography at the Sorbonne University in Paris. He served at UNESCO Headquarters in Paris from 1953 to 1987.

Biography 
M'Bow began working for UNESCO in 1953 and served as its Director-General from 1974 to 1987, being the first black African to head a United Nations organisation. His tenure has been described as marked by an alternative framework for the production of knowledge and information, moving away from Eurocentric tendencies and encouraging the diversity of experiences and cultures. He was President of the PanAfrican Archaeological Association from 1967 to 1971. 

In 1978, he made the speech  "A plea for the return of an irreplaceable cultural heritage to those who created it", where he called for the restitution of cultural heritage from the northern to the southern hemisphere. His call followed the 1973 resolution no. 3187 about the Restitution of works of art to countries victims of expropriation, but had no decisive effect on restitutions. 

In May 1980, M'Bow called the Commission over the Problems of Communication which delivered the MacBride Report (so called after its president, Seán MacBride), supporting international claims for a New World Information and Communication Order. His departure in 1987 followed criticism for administrative and budgetary practices and the US withdrawal from UNESCO in 1984 (followed by the UK in 1985). 

In 1980, M'Bow was awarded an honorary doctorate from the University of Belgrade. He retired to his home country of Senegal in 1987 and celebrated his 100th birthday in March 2021.

Honours
 Grand-Cross of the Order of Prince Henry, Portugal (6 April 2017)

References

External links 

1921 births
Living people
University of Paris alumni
Men centenarians
Senegalese politicians
Senegalese centenarians
UNESCO Directors-General
Member of the Academy of the Kingdom of Morocco
People from Dakar
Senegalese diplomats
Senegalese officials of the United Nations
French Army personnel of World War II
French Air Force personnel of World War II
Senegalese expatriates in France
Culture ministers of Senegal
Education ministers of Senegal